Sholi is an American indie/alternative/experimental group that originated in Davis, California, and now has members dispersed throughout the San Francisco Bay Area. The members include primary songwriter Payam Bavafa, drummer Jonathon Bafus, and bassist Eric Ruud, occasionally with keyboardist Greg Hagel.  In autumn of 2008, Sholi signed to Quarterstick Records / Touch and Go Records. Their full-length debut, produced with Greg Saunier of Deerhoof, was released on February 17, 2009.

Discography
Sholi EP (self-released)
Sholi / The Dead Science Split 7" with The Dead Science (2006), KDVS Recordings
Hejrat 7" (2008), Holocene Music
Dreams Before People Tour EP (2008)
Sholi (2009), Quarterstick Records

References

External links
Sholi Official website
Sholi Facebook Page
Sholi Myspace Page
Touch and Go Records Official Website
Interview with Bavafa on Wired.com

Indie rock musical groups from California
Musical groups from Davis, California
Quarterstick Records artists